Cyclone Sigma was a tropical cyclone that caused severe damage in North Queensland, Australia on 26–27 January 1896 and the loss of at least 23 lives.

The cyclone caused massive destruction to Townsville and surrounding areas. Ten ships were wrecked in the harbour, 17 people died in the flooding, and one sailor was also killed.

The cyclone then travelled south towards Rockhampton, creating heavy rainfall. At least 23 people died in the cyclone, with three reported as missing.

It was thought that ketch Lalla Rookh was wrecked during the cyclone; however, later reports confirmed that she had escaped.

Many buildings were destroyed or badly damaged, including:
 Townsville School of Arts
 Tattersalls Hotel
 Townsville Showground
 Townsville Supreme Court
 St John's Anglican Church
 Cluden Racecourse and railway station

References

Further reading

External links 

1896 in Australia
1896 natural disasters
Sigma
Disasters in Queensland
North Queensland